NGC 4217 is an edge-on spiral galaxy which lies approximately 60 million light-years (18 million parsecs) away in the constellation of Canes Venatici. It is a possible companion galaxy to Messier 106 (also known as NGC 4258).

Gallery

References

External links

Further reading
 

4217
Canes Venatici
Spiral galaxies
039241